The Drygrange Old Bridge is a disused road bridge over the River Tweed near Melrose in the Scottish Borders.

History

It was built between 1776 and 1780 to a design by Scottish architect and engineer Alexander Stevens. It replaced a ferry as part of an improvement to a turnpike road.

It was listed as a Category A listed building in 1971.

It carried the A68 over the Tweed until 1974 when it was replaced by a box girder bridge to the east, engineered by Sir Alexander Gibb & Partners. The old bridge is not open to vehicles, but can be crossed by pedestrians and bicycles.

Design

The rounded cutwaters are carried up to the level of the roadway and are topped with angular pedestrian refuges.

Hollow spandrels reduce the weight of the structure, an innovation by Thomas Telford. The bridge has been modified by raising the level of the roadway on the approaches to make it more level, but the level of the original roadway can be seen in the string course on the exterior of the bridge.

It is near to the Roman settlement of Trimontium, which is to the south-west of the viaduct. To the west of the bridge is the Leaderfoot Viaduct, a disused railway viaduct, and to the east of the Old Bridge is its modern successor. This group of three bridges is sometimes known as Tripontium.

References

External links

Bridges in the Scottish Borders
Listed bridges in Scotland
Category A listed buildings in the Scottish Borders
Bridges across the River Tweed
Bridges completed in 1780